Michael Andrew Foster Jude Kerr, 13th Marquess of Lothian, Baron Kerr of Monteviot,  (born 7 July 1945), commonly known as Michael Ancram, is a British politician and life peer who served as Deputy Leader of the Conservative Party from 2001 to 2005. He was formerly styled Earl of Ancram until he inherited the marquessate in 2004.

Born in London and educated at Ampleforth College, Ancram studied History at Christ Church, Oxford and read Law at the University of Edinburgh. After graduating from Edinburgh, he was called to the Scottish Bar and practised as an advocate before entering politics. He unsuccessfully contested West Lothian in 1970, but was elected as Member of Parliament (MP) for Berwick and East Lothian at the February 1974 general election and served until the election held in October of that year. He re-entered parliament in 1979, representing Edinburgh South until 1987. During this time, he served as a minister at the Scotland Office in Margaret Thatcher's government.

After being elected to represent Devizes at the 1992 general election, Ancram served at the Northern Ireland Office in John Major's government. When Major was defeated at the 1997 general election, the Conservatives entered opposition and Ancram became Chairman of the Conservative Party under William Hague in 1998, having previously covered constitutional affairs in the Shadow Cabinet. This was followed by a period as Deputy Leader of the Conservative Party under Iain Duncan Smith and Michael Howard, during which time he served in the Shadow Cabinet as Shadow Foreign Secretary and Shadow Defence Secretary respectively.

Early life and career
Ancram was born in London and is the elder son and second child of Peter Kerr, 12th Marquess of Lothian, and his wife Antonella. He was educated at the Roman Catholic private school Ampleforth College in North Yorkshire. He graduated with a Bachelor of Arts (BA) in History from Christ Church, Oxford in 1966, later converted to Master of Arts (MA). While studying at Oxford, he was a member of the Bullingdon Club. In 1968, he gained a Bachelor of Laws (LLB) from the University of Edinburgh. He was called to the Scottish Bar in 1970 and practised as an advocate.

Political career

Member of Parliament
Ancram unsuccessfully contested the West Lothian parliamentary seat in 1970. He was first elected to Parliament in the February 1974 general election, when he contested and won the seat of Berwickshire and East Lothian, but lost the seat in the October election of the same year. After losing his seat, he again took up legal practise.

Ancram re-entered Parliament at the 1979 election as the Member of Parliament for Edinburgh South, beating future Prime Minister Gordon Brown. He was a member of the House of Commons Energy Select Committee between 1979 and 1983, and Chairman of the Scottish Conservative and Unionist Party from 1980 to 1983. He was Parliamentary Under-Secretary of State at the Scottish Office with responsibility for Home Affairs, Housing, Local Government, Rating Reform and the Environment from 1983 until 1987. He lost his seat again at the 1987 general election, being one of several prominent Conservatives defeated in Scotland in that contest.

After losing his seat in 1987, Ancram returned to Parliament at the 1992 general election representing Devizes. He was a member of the Public Accounts Committee and Chairman of the backbench Constitutional Affairs Committee from 1992 until May 1993, when he was appointed Parliamentary Under-Secretary of State at the Northern Ireland Office. He was promoted to Minister of State at the Northern Ireland Office in January 1994, and was sworn as a Privy Councillor in January 1996.

Shadow Cabinet and failed leadership bid
After the Conservatives' defeat at the 1997 election, Ancram served in the Shadow Cabinet as Shadow Constitutional Affairs Spokesperson from June 1997 to June 1998. He then served as Chairman of the Conservative Party from December 1998 to September 2001.

In 2001, he ran against Iain Duncan Smith, Michael Portillo, Kenneth Clarke and David Davis in the election for the party leadership. In the first poll of Conservative MPs he and David Davis were tied for last place, leading to a re-run in which Ancram was placed bottom. He was eliminated, and Davis withdrew. Both swung their support behind Iain Duncan Smith, who went on to win, beating Clarke in the final vote of party members. Duncan Smith made Ancram Deputy Leader of the Conservative Party and Shadow Secretary of State for Foreign and Commonwealth Affairs in September 2001. He remained in this position after Michael Howard took over in 2003.

In the reshuffle following the 2005 election, Ancram was moved to Shadow Secretary of State for Defence but remained deputy leader. He stood down from the Shadow Cabinet in December 2005, following the election of David Cameron as Conservative Party Leader. In January 2006 he was appointed to the Intelligence and Security Committee, replacing James Arbuthnot.

Later years as an MP
Ancram was a founding signatory in 2005 of the Henry Jackson Society principles, advocating a proactive approach to the spread of liberal democracy across the world, including when necessary by military intervention. On 21 April 2006 he became one of the first senior Conservative MPs to call for British troops to withdraw from Iraq, saying it was effectively in a state of civil war and that "It is time now for us to get out of Iraq with dignity and honour while we still can."

In 2006, Ancram set up Global Strategy Forum, a bi-partisan foreign affairs think tank based in London.

From 2008 to 2013, Ancram was chair of foreign policy forum Le Cercle.

Ancram is a founder member of the Top Level Group of UK Parliamentarians for Multilateral Nuclear Disarmament and Non-proliferation, established in October 2009.

On 11 August 2009, Ancram announced that he was to stand down as the MP for Devizes at the 2010 general election due to heart problems. He retired when Parliament was dissolved on 12 April 2010; his successor as Conservative member for the Devizes constituency was Claire Perry.

Personal life
Ancram married Lady Jane Fitzalan-Howard, the fourth daughter of The 16th Duke of Norfolk, who on 7 April 2017 succeeded as the 16th Lady Herries of Terregles. They are both prominent Roman Catholics. She is a Patron of the Right to Life Trust and also a patroness of the Royal Caledonian Ball. The couple have three daughters and two grandchildren:

Sarah Margaret Kerr (13 June 1976 – 13 June 1976)
Lady Clare Therese Kerr (25 January 1979) married to The Right Honourable Nick Hurd, son of former Cabinet Minister, Douglas, Lord Hurd of Westwell, in August 2010. Lady Clare is the heiress presumptive to her mother’s title.  They have two children:
Leila Rose Hurd (17 May 2012)
Caspar Jamie Hurd (30 September 2014)
Lady Mary Kerr (28 May 1981). She married Zackary Adler on 28 May 2016.

Ancram's younger sister, Lady Cecil Cameron OBE, married Clan Chieftain, Donald Cameron of Lochiel.  Another sister, the former Lady Clare Kerr, is now Dowager Countess of Euston and mother of the 12th Duke of Grafton.

Ancram is a keen country music fan and has often played acoustic guitar at Conservative Party conferences. He is a knight of Order of St John and Order of St Lazarus; he was also made a Freeman of Gibraltar in 2010.

He was appointed a Deputy Lieutenant for Roxburgh, Ettrick and Lauderdale in 1990. He became a Queen's Counsel (QC) in 1996.

A member of the House of Lords since 2010, he is the only marquess currently sitting as of September 2022. Ancram is hereditary Chief of the Scottish Clan Kerr.

Name and titles
Although his family name is Kerr, Michael Ancram was known from birth by the courtesy title Earl of Ancram as elder son and heir apparent of the 12th Marquess of Lothian. He is said to have dropped the use of this title in favour of plain Mr Michael Ancram after becoming a lawyer, supposedly because he believed it might confuse the jury if any judge were to have addressed him as "My Lord".

Ancram is known to many of his friends as Crumb, a nickname attributed to a party in the sixties at which on arrival Ancram introduced himself as "Lord Ancram" and was duly announced as "Mr Norman Crumb".

Ancram became Marquess of Lothian upon his father's death in October 2004, but did not take up use of this title in public life whilst still sitting as an MP (although properly he should have ceased being styled by the courtesy title of Earl of Ancram). The House of Lords Act 1999 meant that, on acceding to the peerage, he was not disqualified from sitting in the House of Commons as hereditary peers no longer have an automatic right to sit in the House of Lords. Apart from Irish peers, he was, after the Viscount Thurso, Tony Benn and Viscount Hailsham, the fourth person to have sat in the House of Commons while simultaneously being a hereditary peer.

Ancram was created a life peer on 22 November 2010 as Baron Kerr of Monteviot, of Monteviot in Roxburghshire, and was introduced in the House of Lords the same day; by custom, he is referred to by his senior title as The Marquess of Lothian during all parliamentary business and in other official records such as Hansard.

As the Kerr family titles cannot pass through the female line, the heir presumptive to his hereditary titles is his younger brother Lord Ralph Kerr. His elder daughter is her mother's heir presumptive to be Lady Herries of Terregles. Ancram is also one of the five co-heirs to the barony of Butler, abeyant since 1905. Though the most junior heir by primogeniture, he holds the strongest claim, as the other heirs have a lesser share to that title. Upon his death, assuming the barony of Butler is not called out of abeyance, his share will be subdivided between his two daughters.

Arms

Notelist

References

External links
 
 Ask Aristotle: Michael Ancram MP, Politics.guardian.co.uk. Accessed 23 November 2022.
 The Public Whip – Michael Ancram MP: Voting record, publicwhip.org.uk. Accessed 23 November 2022.
 Michael Ancram profile, BBC.co.uk. 17 October 2002.
 Profile, globalstrategyforum.org. Accessed 23 November 2022.
 Profile Debrett's People of Today. Accessed 23 November 2022.
 Profile, burkespeerage.com. Accessed 23 November 2022.
 

|-

|-

|-

|-

|-

|-

|-

|-

|-

1945 births
Alumni of Christ Church, Oxford
Alumni of the University of Edinburgh School of Law
British Roman Catholics
Chairmen of the Conservative Party (UK)
Kerr of Monteviot
Knights of Malta
Living people
Members of the Faculty of Advocates
Members of the Parliament of the United Kingdom for Edinburgh constituencies
Conservative Party (UK) MPs for English constituencies
Scottish Conservative Party MPs
Hereditary peers elected to the House of Commons
Members of the Privy Council of the United Kingdom
People educated at Ampleforth College
Politicians from London
Recipients of the Order of Saint Lazarus (statuted 1910)
Scottish clan chiefs
Scottish King's Counsel
UK MPs 1974
UK MPs 1979–1983
UK MPs 1983–1987
UK MPs 1992–1997
UK MPs 1997–2001
UK MPs 2001–2005
UK MPs 2005–2010
Lothian, Michael Ancram, 11th Marquess
Marquesses of Lothian
Northern Ireland Office junior ministers
Scottish people of Italian descent
Deputy Lieutenants in Scotland
Bullingdon Club members
Life peers created by Elizabeth II
Kerr